The adjective hygrophanous refers to the color change of mushroom tissue (especially the pileus surface) as it loses or absorbs water, which causes the pileipellis to become more transparent when wet and opaque when dry. 

When identifying hygrophanous species, one needs to be careful when matching colors to photographs or descriptions, as color can change dramatically soon after picking. 

Genera that are characterized by hygrophanous species include Agrocybe, Psathyrella, Psilocybe, Panaeolus, and Galerina.

External links
 IMA Mycological Glossary: Hygrophanous
 Wisconsin Mycological Society: Psathyrella Photographs of Psathyrella, a mushroom with a strongly hygrophanous pileus.

Fungal morphology and anatomy